The 2013 International Championship was a professional ranking snooker tournament that took place between 27 October and 3 November 2013 at the Chengdu Eastern Music Park in Chengdu, China. It was the fifth ranking event of the 2013/2014 season.

Judd Trump was the defending champion, but he lost 5–6 against Alan McManus in the last 64.

Ding Junhui won his ninth ranking title by defeating Marco Fu 10–9 in the final. Ding became the first player to win three consecutive ranking titles since Stephen Hendry in 1993. This was also the third consecutive all-Asian ranking final, after Ding defeating Xiao Guodong at the Shanghai Masters and Aditya Mehta at the Indian Open.

Prize fund
The total prize money of the event was raised to £625,000 from the previous year's £600,000. The breakdown of prize money for this year is shown below:

 Winner: £125,000
 Runner-up: £65,000
 Semi-final: £30,000
 Quarter-final: £17,500
 Last 16: £12,000
 Last 32: £7,000
 Last 64: £3,000

 Non-televised highest break: £0
 Televised highest break: £1,000
 Total: £625,000

Wildcard round
These matches were played in Chengdu on 27 October 2013.

Main draw

Final

Qualifying
These matches took place on 1 and 2 October 2013 at the Barnsley Metrodome in Barnsley, England. All matches were best of 11 frames.

Century breaks

Qualifying stage centuries

 142  Gerard Greene
 140, 136, 107, 105  Neil Robertson
 132  Sam Baird
 130  Mark Allen
 129  Stuart Carrington
 124  Ryan Clark
 123, 103  Gary Wilson
 121  Robbie Williams
 119  Chris Wakelin
 118  Pankaj Advani
 115  Ryan Day
 109  David Gilbert
 108  Michael Leslie
 107  Michael Wasley
 107  John Astley

 106, 103  Stephen Maguire
 106  Stuart Bingham
 106  Liang Wenbo
 103  Joe Perry
 103  Alex Borg
 102  Fergal O'Brien
 102  Peter Ebdon
 102  Kurt Maflin
 101  Sean O'Sullivan
 101  Joe Swail
 101  Shaun Murphy
 100  Rod Lawler
 100  Daniel Wells
 100  Oliver Brown

Televised stage centuries

 143, 128, 117, 100, 100, 100  Neil Robertson
 143  Mark Davis
 138, 131, 127, 126, 121, 110, 110, 108, 108  Ding Junhui
 137  Craig Steadman
 134, 115, 107, 105, 103, 103, 102  Joe Perry
 134  Peter Ebdon
 128, 116, 112, 105, 103  Marco Fu
 127  Matthew Selt
 126, 121  Graeme Dott
 126  Stephen Maguire
 125  Shaun Murphy
 123, 111  Mark Allen
 123, 103  Fergal O'Brien
 122  Kyren Wilson
 121, 120  Ronnie O'Sullivan
 118, 111  Liang Wenbo

 116, 107  Mark Selby
 114  Barry Hawkins
 110, 102  Judd Trump
 110  Zhang Anda
 109  Zhao Xintong
 109  Stuart Bingham
 107  Joe Swail
 106  Zhou Yuelong
 106  Kurt Maflin
 105  John Higgins
 104  Dave Harold
 103  Xiao Guodong
 103  Rod Lawler
 103  Ryan Day
 100  David Gilbert

References

External links
 2013 International Championship – Pictures by Mr Yu Yan and Tai Chengzhe at Facebook

2013
International Championship
International Championship
Sport in Chengdu